First Lady of Guinea (French: Première Dame de la République de Guinée) is the title attributed to the wife of the President of Guinea. The country's present first lady is Lauriane Doumbouya, wife of interim President Mamady Doumbouya, who had held the position since the 2021 Guinean coup d'etat on September 5, 2021. There has been no first gentleman of Guinea to date.

First Ladies of Guinea

References

Guinea
Guinean women in politics